The National Stadium was a rugby union and football stadium built on the Cardiff Arms Park site in Cardiff, Wales. In 1969 construction began on the stadium which replaced the existing rugby ground built in 1881. The stadium was home to the Wales national rugby union team since 1964 and the Wales national football team since 1989. In 1997 the stadium was demolished to make way for the new Millennium Stadium.

History

Background
 
The National Stadium, which was also known as the Welsh National Rugby Ground, was designed by Osborne V Webb & Partners and built by G A Williamson & Associates of Porthcawl and Andrew Scott & Company of Port Talbot.

Redevelopment
After agreement from the Cardiff Athletic Club, the freehold of the south ground was transferred solely to the WRU in July 1968. Work could then begin on the new National Stadium. Glamorgan County Cricket Club would move to Sophia Gardens and the cricket ground to the north would be demolished and a new rugby union stadium built for Cardiff RFC, who would move out of the south ground, allowing the National Stadium to be built, for the sole use of the national rugby union team.
 
On 17 October 1970, the new North Stand and the Cardiff RFC ground was completed, the North Stand cost just over £1 million. The West Stand was opened in 1977 and the new East Terrace was completed by March 1980. By the time the final South Stand had been completed and the stadium officially opened on 7 April 1984, the South Stand had cost £4.5 million. At the start of the project, the total cost was estimated at £2.25 million, although by time it was finished in 1984, it had risen by nearly four times that amount.

Official opening
Although the stadium was not officially opened until 7 April 1984, it had remained in constant use since WRU's takeover in 1968. The official opening was celebrated by a match between Wales and a WRU President's XV made up of players from other international teams. Wales won 27–17. The original capacity was 65,000 but this had to be reduced in later years to 53,000 for safety reasons. 11,000 of these were on the East Terrace and the conversion to all-seater stadium would have reduced the stadium capacity still further to 47,500. This capacity would have been much less than Twickenham and the other major rugby venues and also less than the demand for tickets to major events.
 
A world record crowd of 56,000 for a rugby union club match watched Llanelli RFC beat Neath RFC by 28 to 13 points in the final of the WRU Challenge Cup on 7 May 1988. The first evening game to be played under floodlights was held on 4 September 1991 at 8.00 pm, between Wales and France. The last international match to be held at the National Stadium was between Wales and England on 15 March 1997, and the last ever match held at the National Stadium was on 26 April 1997 between Cardiff and Swansea, Cardiff won the SWALEC Cup (WRU Challenge Cup) by 33 to 26 points.

Demolition

 
In 1995, a decision was made to demolish the stadium as it had begun to fall behind the standards of other major European stadiums. Demolition work began in 1997 to make way for the Millennium Stadium which opened in 1999.

Usage

Rugby union
The National Stadium is best known as the venue for what is considered to be "the greatest try ever scored" by Gareth Edwards for the Barbarians against New Zealand in what is also called "the greatest match ever played" on 27 January 1973. The final result was a win for the Barbarians. The score, 23–11, which translates to 27–13 in today's scoring system.
 
The scorers were:

Barbarians: Tries: Gareth Edwards, Fergus Slattery, John Bevan, J P R Williams; Conversions: Phil Bennett (2); Penalty: Phil Bennett.

All Blacks: Tries: Grant Batty (2); Penalty: Joseph Karam.
 
The National Stadium hosted four games in the 1991 Rugby World Cup, including the third-place play-off. The National Stadium was also host to the inaugural Heineken Cup final of 1995–96 when Toulouse beat Cardiff RFC by 21–18 after extra time, in front of 21,800 spectators. The following final in 1996–97 was also held at the National Stadium, this time it was between Brive and Leicester Tigers. Brive won the match 28–9, in front of a crowd of 41,664.

The stadium was the regular venue for the WRU Challenge Cup final from the competition's inception in 1972 to the stadium closure in 1997. It also hosted the Snelling Sevens tournament from 1968 to 1982, and from 1992 to 1995.

Rugby World Cup
The National Stadium hosted the following matches of the 1991 Rugby World Cup.

Association football
On 31 May 1989, Wales national football team played its first international game against the West Germany national football team at the Stadium in a World Cup qualifying match, which ended goalless. It was also the first ever international football match held in Great Britain that was watched by all-seater spectators.

Boxing

Around 25,000 spectators watched international boxing on 1 October 1993, at the Stadium with a World Boxing Council (WBC) Heavyweight title bout between Lennox Lewis and Frank Bruno. It was the first time that two British-born boxers had fought for the world heavyweight title. Lewis beat Bruno by a technical knockout in the 7th round, in what was called the "Battle of Britain".

Concerts

Greyhound racing

Cardiff Greyhounds was the greyhound racing operation held at the National Stadium from 1967-1977.

Singing tradition 
The National Stadium was known primarily as the venue for massed voices singing such hymns as "Cwm Rhondda", "Calon Lân", "Men of Harlech" and "Hen Wlad Fy Nhadau" ("Land of my Fathers" – the national anthem of Wales). The legendary atmosphere including singing of the crowd was said to be worth at least a try or a goal to the home nation. This tradition of singing has now passed on to the Millennium Stadium.

See also
Sport in Cardiff

Notes

References
Inline

 
General
 Harris, K. M. The Story of the Development of the National Rugby Ground, 7 April 1984. Cover of the booklet on www.rugbyrelics.com

External links
   

Stadiums in Cardiff
Sports venues demolished in 1997
1997 disestablishments in Wales
Rugby union stadiums in Wales
Rugby World Cup stadiums